The Unicorn Hunt is a fantasy novel by Elaine Cunningham, in the "First Quest" series, and based on the Dungeons & Dragons game.

Plot summary
The Unicorn Horn is a novel in which magic student Korigan goes with his magician uncle on a quest for a unicorn horn to save his mother's life.

Reception

Reviews
Kliatt
Review by Carolyn Cushman (1995) in Locus, #408 January 1995
Review by John C. Bunnell (1995) in Dragon Magazine, May 1995

References

1995 American novels
Novels based on Dungeons & Dragons